Han Ji-sang (born July 25, 1982) is a South Korean actor. Han debuted as a stage actor in the musical Grease.

Han Ji Sang is also one of the top 5 most wanted actors in musicals.

On July 25, 2014, Han successfully held his concert Han Ji Sang Premium Concert in Tokyo at Tokyo Hall in Tokyo, Japan.

In 2019 Han Ji Sang was cast as the voice of "Jack" for Disney's Marry Poppins Returns, the actor sang several songs for the movie including "Lovely London Sky" and the biggest musical sequence in the movie "Trip a little light fantastic".

Early life
Han was born in Seoul. One month after his birth, his family suddenly left for France. He was in Paris until 4-years old and attended Kindergarten there. Then he was fluent in French but could not remember any of it now.

Jisang's family resided in New York City for two years where he attended elementary school before returning to Korea.

According to Jisang he suffered from Dyslexia and Obsessive Compulsive Disorder but was an honor student with good grades and served as the vice president of his class.

Theater

Filmography

Film

Television series

Entertainment

Awards and nominations

References

External links 
 Han Ji-sang Fan Cafe at Naver 
 
 

1982 births
Living people
South Korean male musical theatre actors
South Korean male stage actors
South Korean male television actors
South Korean male film actors